Gerald Isaac Stiller (June 8, 1927 – May 11, 2020) was an American actor and comedian. He spent many years as part of the comedy duo Stiller and Meara with his wife, Anne Meara, to whom he was married for over 60 years until her death in 2015. Stiller saw a late-career resurgence starting in 1993, playing George Costanza's father Frank on the sitcom Seinfeld, a part which earned him an Emmy nomination. The year Seinfeld went off the air, Stiller began his role as the eccentric Arthur Spooner on the CBS comedy series The King of Queens, another role that garnered widespread acclaim.

Stiller appeared together with his son Ben Stiller in films such as Zoolander, Heavyweights, Hot Pursuit, The Heartbreak Kid, and Zoolander 2. He also performed voice-over work for films and television, including The Lion King 1½ and Planes: Fire and Rescue. In his later career, Stiller became known for portraying grumpy and eccentric characters who were nevertheless beloved.

Early life 
The eldest of four children, Stiller was born on June 8, 1927, at Unity Hospital in Brooklyn, New York City, to Bella (née Citron; 1902–1954) and William Stiller (1896–1999), a taxi and bus driver. His family was Jewish. His paternal grandparents emigrated from Galicia (southeast Poland and western Ukraine), and his mother was born in Frampol, Poland. He lived in the Williamsburg and East New York neighborhoods before his family moved to the Lower East Side, where he attended Seward Park High School and played Adolf Hitler in a school production.

Upon his return from service in the U.S. Army during World War II, Stiller attended Syracuse University, earning a bachelor's degree in Speech and Drama in 1950. He also studied drama at HB Studio in Greenwich Village. In the 1953 Phoenix Theater production of Coriolanus (produced by John Houseman), Stiller, along with Gene Saks and Jack Klugman, formed (as told by Houseman in the 1980 memoir Front and Center) "the best trio of Shakespearian clowns that I have ever seen on any stage".

Also in 1953, Stiller met actress-comedian Anne Meara, and they married in 1954. Until Stiller suggested it, Meara had never thought of doing comedy. "Jerry started us being a comedy team," she said. "He always thought I would be a great comedy partner." They joined the Chicago improvisational company The Compass Players (which later became The Second City) and, after leaving, began performing together. In 1961 they were performing in nightclubs in New York City and by the following year were considered a "national phenomenon", said the New York Times.

Stiller and Meara 

The comedy team Stiller and Meara, composed of Stiller and his wife, Anne Meara, was successful throughout the 1960s, with numerous appearances on television variety programs, primarily on The Ed Sullivan Show. In 1970, they broke up the live act before it broke up their marriage. They subsequently forged a career in radio commercials, notably the campaign for Blue Nun wine. They also starred in their own syndicated five-minute sketch comedy show on radio, Take Five with Stiller and Meara, from 1977 to 1978.

From 1979 to 1982, Stiller and Meara hosted HBO Sneak Previews, a half-hour show produced monthly on which they described the movies and programs to be featured in the coming month. They also did some comedy sketches between show discussions. The duo had their own 1986 TV sitcom, The Stiller and Meara Show, in which Stiller played the deputy mayor of New York City and Meara portrayed his wife, a TV commercial actress.

Resurgence

Seinfeld 
Late in his career, Stiller earned the part of the short-tempered Frank Costanza, father of George Costanza, on the sitcom Seinfeld, a role which Stiller played from 1993 until 1998. Stiller's character as initially envisioned was a "meek" and "Thurberesque" character that required him to wear a bald cap. After a couple of days of rehearsal Stiller realized the character wasn't working and asked Seinfeld co-creator Larry David if he could perform the character in a different way, which was more in line with his final characterization on the show. For his portrayal of Frank, Stiller gained widespread critical and popular acclaim, including being nominated for an Emmy for Outstanding Guest Actor in a Comedy Series in 1997 and winning an American Comedy Award for Funniest Male Guest Appearance in a TV Series in 1998.

The King of Queens 
After Seinfeld ended, Stiller had planned on retiring. However, Kevin James asked him to join the cast of The King of Queens. James, who played the leading role of Doug Heffernan, had told Stiller that he needed him to have a successful show. Stiller agreed and played the role of Arthur Spooner, the father of Carrie Heffernan, from 1998 until 2007. Stiller said that this role tested his acting ability more than any other had, and that, before being a part of The King of Queens, he only saw himself as a "decent actor".

Other appearances 

Stiller played himself in filmed skits opening and closing Canadian rock band Rush's 30th Anniversary Tour concerts in 2004. These appearances are seen on the band's DVD R30: 30th Anniversary World Tour, released in 2005. Stiller later appeared in cameos for in-concert films for the band's 2007–08 Snakes & Arrows Tour. Stiller appeared on Dick Clark's $20,000 Pyramid show in the 1970s, and footage of the appearance was edited into an episode of The King of Queens to assist the storyline about his character being a contestant on the show, and, after losing, being bitter about the experience, as he never received his parting gift, a lifetime supply of Rice-a-Roni. He also made several appearances on the game show Tattletales with his wife, Anne Meara.

In the late 1990s, Stiller appeared in a series of Nike television commercials as the ghost of deceased Green Bay Packers head coach Vince Lombardi. He also appeared in various motion pictures, most notably Zoolander (2001) and Secret of the Andes (1999). On February 9, 2007, Stiller and Meara were honored with a joint star on the Hollywood Walk of Fame. On October 28, 2010, the couple appeared on an episode of The Daily Show with Jon Stewart. Stiller voiced the announcer on the children's educational show Crashbox. Starting in October 2010, Stiller and Meara began starring in Stiller & Meara, a Yahoo web series from Red Hour Digital in which they discussed current topics. Each episode was about two minutes long. Stiller also worked as a spokesman for Xfinity.

Author 

Stiller wrote the foreword to the 2005 book Festivus: The Holiday for the Rest of Us by Allen Salkin. The book discussed Festivus, the fictional holiday promulgated by Stiller's Seinfeld character Frank Costanza.

Stiller also authored a memoir titled Married to Laughter: A Love Story Featuring Anne Meara, which was published by Simon & Schuster.

Personal life 

Stiller was married to Anne Meara for over 60 years, from 1954 until her death on May 23, 2015. The two met in an agent's office. Meara was upset about an interaction with the casting agent, so Stiller took her out for coffee—all he could afford—and they remained together ever since. Meara was Irish Catholic and converted to Judaism before the couple's two children were born. They had two children: actress Amy Stiller (born 1961) and actor-comedian Ben Stiller (born 1965). He had two grandchildren through Ben.

Death 
On May 11, 2020, Stiller died from natural causes at his home on the Upper West Side of Manhattan at the age of 92.   Many actors Stiller worked with, including Seinfeld castmates Jerry Seinfeld, Julia Louis-Dreyfus, Jason Alexander, and Michael Richards and King of Queens castmates Kevin James and Leah Remini, paid tributes to him on social media.

Filmography

Film

Television

Stage

Accolades

Awards and nominations

Other 
 In 2007, Stiller and his wife Anne Meara received a star on the Hollywood Walk of Fame.

References

External links 

 
 
 
 
 Jerry Stiller at the Comedy Hall of Fame
 

1927 births
2020 deaths
Male actors from New York City
American male comedians
American male film actors
American people of Austrian-Jewish descent
American people of Polish-Jewish descent
American male television actors
American male voice actors
American Ashkenazi Jews
Jewish American writers
Jewish American male actors
People from the Lower East Side
Syracuse University alumni
People from Williamsburg, Brooklyn
Military personnel from New York City
Comedians from New York City
Jewish American male comedians
20th-century American comedians
21st-century American comedians
People from East New York, Brooklyn
Seward Park High School alumni
United States Army personnel of World War II
United States Army personnel of the Korean War
United States Army soldiers
21st-century American Jews